Bagirmi (also Baguirmi; autonym: ɓarma) is the language of the Baguirmi people of Chad, belonging to the Nilo-Saharan family.  It was spoken by 44,761 people in 1993, mainly in the Chari-Baguirmi Region, as well as in Mokofi sub-prefecture of Guéra Region. It was the language of the Kingdom of Baguirmi.

Baguirmi was given written form, and texts providing basic literacy instruction were composed through the efforts of Don and Orpha Raun late in their Chadian careers, during the 1990s. A font to support the Baguirmi alphabet, and a Keyman input method for Latin keyboards, were developed by Anthony Kimball in 2003, and the body of published Baguirmi literature continues to expand. The majority of this literature is distributed in Chad by David Raun at a token cost, as a service to the Baguirmi-speaking peoples of Chad.

References

External links
Keyman - Type in Baguirmi

Bongo–Bagirmi languages
Languages of Chad